Face is a 2002 drama film written by Bertha Bay Sa Pan and Oren Moverman and directed by Bertha Bay-Sa Pan starring Bai Ling, Kristy Wu, Kieu Chinh, Treach, Ken Leung, Will Yun Lee, and Tina Chen.

Face premiered at the 2002 Sundance Film Festival where it was a nominee for the Grand Jury Prize Dramatic.

Synopsis 
Kim (Bai Ling) is a timid and conflicted 20 year old in the 1970s, struggling to sort out her relationship with her traditional mother (Kieu Chinh) while forging a future for herself at college.  Attempting to tread the fine line between dutiful daughter and independent woman, Kim has an unfortunate one-night stand with Daniel (Will Yun Lee), the spoiled and arrogant son of a wealthy family, and discovers that she is pregnant.  Forced to marry Daniel and trapped in a nightmare marriage with a newborn infant, Kim leaves her daughter Genie to be raised by her mother.

19 years later... Genie (Kristy Wu) is a bright and independent 19 year old on the cusp of adulthood in the 1990s, who walks successfully in two separate worlds; that of her grandmother's traditional community in Queens and the contrasting and vibrant downtown hip hop scene in New York City. When she falls in love with Michael (Treach), an African American DJ at a local club, and her mother Kim resurfaces from Hong Kong with plans to move back to New York, these three women are forced to resolve their betrayals and family history in order to survive.

Cast
 Bai Ling as Kim
 Kristy Wu as Genie
 Kieu Chinh as Mrs. Liu
 Treach as Michael
 Will Yun Lee as Daniel
Ken Leung as Willie
Tina Chen as Mrs. Chang
 Melissa Martinez as Sue
 Dee Dee Mango as Kelly
 Les J.N. Mau as Mr. Huang
 Diane Cheng as Mrs. Mar
 Kristy Qin as Jenny
 Ruth Zhang as Mrs. Huang
 Jim Chu as Steve
 Ben Wang as Mr. Leung
 Susan Bigelow as Hospital Nurse
 Paul J.Q. Lee as Husband #2
 Tina Factor as Asian Woman

Production
Face began as an acclaimed short film by Bertha Bay-Sa Pan when she was a student at Columbia University’s Graduate Film School. The short went on to play at dozens of film festivals all over the world and was honored with the Polo Ralph Lauren Award for Best Screenplay at Columbia.  The film also brought Pan the Director’s Guild Award for Best Asian American Student Filmmaker in 1997

Release
The film had its world premiere at the Sundance Film Festival on January, 2002, in the Dramatic Competition. It received a limited theatrical release in the United States on March 18, 2005.

Reception
Michael Wilmington, a critic for the Chicago Tribune, praised the direction and performances writing, "[‘Face’] is realistic and highly entertaining... perceptively written, imaginatively directed [and] brilliantly acted.... Pan's three actresses give astonishingly varied, spontaneous, powerfully human, award-worthy portrayals. As a filmmaker, Pan succeeds on almost every level: generating atmosphere, weaving an engrossing tale and eliciting marvelous performances.” Anita Gates selected the film as a NY Times Critic's Choice Pick. Dana Stevens, a critic for The New York Times, wrote, "[Face]... is likely to remain in your head long afterward... [T]he director's attention to details of character and locale makes for a precise evocation of a New York seldom seen in feature films." Another critic for The New York Times, David Edelstein, wrote of the film, "[Face]...takes a conventional culture-clash theme and gives it the kick (and hop) of a good music mix tape." Kirk Honeycutt for The Hollywood Reporter wrote, "Luminous… Pan's actors are exceptional… with a vibrant hip hop score and atmospheric cinematography." Lisa Rose for The NJ Star Ledger wrote, "A film with visual flair, musical inspiration and dramatic gravity. From the top to the bottom of the cast list, there are performances rich in detail and intelligence." Owen Gleiberman for Entertainment Weekly wrote, "If these mild tales of domestic scandal, which make up the movie Face, sound familiar and even a bit cliché, they are just that, yet it’s a testament to the bare-bones decency displayed by director Bertha Bay-Sa Pan that we’re compelled by them anyway." G. Allen Johnson for SFGate wrote, "Co-writer and first-time director Bertha Bay Sa-Pan smartly alternates between the 1970s and present day, allowing us to observe the pressures each young woman had to endure, and why each one makes the decisions they do. The cast is very good, filled with bright young talent, and John Inwood's cinematography, which helps differentiate the eras depicted, is top-notch[.]" The publication TimeOut wrote of the film, "The culture clash between immigrant parents and their American-born children is familiar territory, but New Jersey–born, Taiwan-raised director and co-writer Bay-Sa Pan gives the material her own spin and elicits strong performances from her appealing cast."

Accolades

Awards and nominations

Music

Score
The film was scored by Leonard Nelson Hubbard (aka Hub) of the Grammy Award winning hip-hop band the Roots; featuring live recordings by the internationally renowned Peking Opera Orchestra, and CHOPS of Mountain Brothers.

Soundtrack

The soundtrack includes theme song “Face” written and performed by Naughty by Nature, original song “Just Can’t Hold On” by Tre Hardson           (SlimKid3 of the hip hop pioneering group Pharcyde). Kim Hill's (formerly of the Black Eyed Peas) song "Open Wide" also features on the soundtrack.

Track listing

References

External links

2002 films
Films about Chinese Americans
Films about Taiwanese Americans
American independent films
2000s English-language films
Asian-American drama films
2002 independent films
2000s American films